SuperBrawl was the inaugural SuperBrawl professional wrestling pay-per-view (PPV) event produced by World Championship Wrestling (WCW). The show took place on May 19, 1991 and was held at the Bayfront Center in St. Petersburg, Florida.

The main event of the show was a match between then reigning WCW World Heavyweight Champion Ric Flair and the NWA World Heavyweight Champion Tatsumi Fujinami with both world championships on the line. In the United States the match was promoted as simply being for the WCW World Heavyweight Championship, not promoting the fact that Fujinami had defeated Flair for the NWA World Heavyweight Championship in March 1991. The undercard saw Bobby Eaton win the WCW World Television Championship from Arn Anderson while The Steiner Brothers defended the WCW World Tag Team Championship. In the opening match, The Fabulous Freebirds won the vacant WCW United States Tag Team Championship. The show consisted of twelve matches, with some of the matches being edited out of the official VHS tape release of the show. The event also featured the television debut of Johnny B. Badd.

In 2015, all WCW pay-per-views were made available on the WWE Network.

Storylines

The event featured wrestlers from pre-existing scripted feuds and storylines. Wrestlers portrayed villains, heroes, or less distinguishable characters in the scripted events that built tension and culminated in a wrestling match or series of matches.

SuperBrawl I was the direct follow up to events that happened on the first ever WCW/New Japan Supershow that had happened on March 21, 1991. The show took place in Japan and was co-promoted by World Championship Wrestling (WCW) and their Japanese partner promotion New Japan Pro-Wrestling (NJPW). In the main event of the SuperShow, IWGP Heavyweight Champion put his title against Ric Flair who defended the NWA World Heavyweight Championship. Fujinami won the match and the NWA World Heavyweight Championship, becoming the first wrestler to hold both championships.

The match and the match outcome was presented very differently in the United States where they billed Flair as the WCW World Heavyweight Champion, not mentioning the fact that the NWA World Heavyweight Championship was considered a separate championship in Japan. WCW and the American media claimed that Flair retained the WCW World Heavyweight Championship due to Flair being thrown over the top rope near the end of the match. SuperBrawl's main event focused on Ric Flair "getting revenge" on Fujinami as he defended his WCW World Heavyweight Championship, which in Japan was billed as being for both championships, not just the WCW World Heavyweight Championship. The storyline of Flair "defending WCW and America" painted him as more of a heroic character than the villain he had been working as for over a year prior to the match, with the Florida crowd cheering for Flair during the match.

Ron Simmons and Butch Reed began working together as a tag team known simply as Doom, initially as a masked team and later unmasked under the real names. Together they held the WCW World Tag Team Championship and had several high quality, well received matches against tag teams such as The Steiner Brothers, Arn Anderson and Barry Windham and others. In early 1991, tension built between the two tag team partners as Simmons grew frustrated with the team after they lost the championship to The Fabulous Freebirds (Jimmy Garvin and Michael Hayes) on February 24, 1991. After the title loss, the two fought against each other with manager Theodore Long siding with Reed while Simmons turned into a fan favorite in the process. Due to Long helping Reed cheat during matches between the two, the SuperBrawl match had the added stipulation that Long would be locked in a small cage suspended in the air during the match.

On February 18, 1991, The Steiner Brothers (Rick Steiner and Scott Steiner) defeated The Fabulous Freebirds to win the WCW World Tag Team Championship while already holding the WCW United States Tag Team Championship. On April 6, the WCW Board of directors declared the WCW United States Tag Team Championship vacant to allow the Steiners to focus on the WCW World Tag Team Championship. WCW scheduled the two top contender teams, The Fabulous Freebirds and The Young Pistols (Steve Armstrong and Tracy Smothers) in a "Top Contenders" match for the vacant championship. At the time, The Freebirds and The Young Pistols were already engaged in a long running storyline rivalry, with the championship match being one of the highlights of the storyline.

Results 

Note – Matches 3–7 were not included on the original VHS release. A complete version of the event has since been available on the WWE Network.

Aftermath 
SuperBrawl was the last time WCW alluded to the fact that the WCW World Heavyweight Championship and the NWA World Heavyweight Championship were separate championships until 1992 when the two championships began to be fought for separately. SuperBrawl would be Flair's last WCW main event for several years as he left the company less than two months later due to a pay dispute. At the time of his departure, he was still the champion and he took the title belt that represented the championship with him as collateral due to unpaid waged Flair felt he was owed. The match between The Steiner Brothers and Sting and Lex Luger was voted the 1991 "Match of the Year" by the readers of Pro Wrestling Illustrated. Butch Reed left WCW shortly after SuperBrawl with the steel cage match between the two effectively ending the feud between the former members of Doom. Sid Vicious' loss to El Gigante turned out to be his last match with WCW at the time, as his contract had expired and he signed a contract to work for WCW's rival, the World Wrestling Federation (WWF, now WWE). The Windham/Pillman feud continued for a couple of months, leading to Windham pinning Brian Pillman in a match on the Clash of the Champions XV: Knocksville USA show that forced Pillman to leave WCW. The storyline was that Pillman would return and wrestle as the masked Yellow Dog, frustrating Windham and other villains as they kept claiming it was Pillman under the mask. The feud between The Fabulous Freebirds and The Young Pistols continued for several months, including several title defenses. On July 14, 1991, The Young Pistols teamed up with Dustin Rhodes to defeat The Freebirds and Badstreet on the undercard of the 1991 Great American Bash show.

Bobby Eaton (after many years of tag team wrestling with the Midnight Express) won his first singles title since he won the Georgia National Television Title in 1981, and held the title for 15 days before losing to "Stunning" Steve Austin at a taping of WCW Worldwide, Austin would hold the title for nearly a year.

References 

1991 in Florida
SuperBrawl 1
Events in St. Petersburg, Florida
Professional wrestling in Florida
Professional wrestling in St. Petersburg, Florida
1991 World Championship Wrestling pay-per-view events